Cleisomeria is a genus of flowering plants in the orchid family Orchidaceae native to southeast Asia from Bangladesh to Borneo.

Taxonomy

Species
The genus contains two accepted species:
Cleisomeria lanatum (Lindl.) Lindl. ex G.Don in J.C.Loudon - Bangladesh, Myanmar, Thailand, Laos, Vietnam, Cambodia, Malaysia, Borneo
Cleisomeria pilosulum (Gagnep.) Seidenf. & Garay - Myanmar, Thailand, Laos, Vietnam, Cambodia

Physiology
Various alkaloids, flavonoids, saponins, tannins, phenolic compunds, terpenoids, steroids, glycosides, quinines, coumarins, proteins, and resins have been isolated from Cleisomeria lanatum. The isolated compounds have been shown to exhibit some potential as anti-inflammatory, antioxidant, and thrombolytic agents.

References

External links 

Vandeae genera
Aeridinae